Marmoricola aequoreus is a Gram-positive, aerobic, non-spore-forming and non-motile bacterium from the genus Marmoricola which has been isolated from sediments from Samyang beach, Korea.

References

External links 
Type strain of Marmoricola aequoreus at BacDive -  the Bacterial Diversity Metadatabase

Propionibacteriales
Bacteria described in 2007